Berzy-le-Sec is a former commune in the department of Aisne in Hauts-de-France in northern France. On 1 January 2023, it was merged into the new commune of Bernoy-le-Château.

Population

See also
Communes of the Aisne department

References

Former communes of Aisne
Aisne communes articles needing translation from French Wikipedia